GW-842,166X is a drug which acts as a potent and selective cannabinoid CB2 receptor agonist, with a novel chemical structure based on a pyrimidine core. It has potent analgesic, anti-inflammatory and anti-hyperalgesic actions in animal models, but without cannabis-like behavioural effects due to its extremely low affinity for the CB1 receptor. GSK brought this compound for into 4 clinical trials, two of them related to pain management and the other two related to bio-distributions. The trials were either withdrawn or completed without posting result.

References

Cannabinoids
Trifluoromethyl compounds
Aminopyrimidines
Chlorobenzenes